Squadron Leader Percival Harold Beake,  (17 March 1917 – 25 June 2016) was a British RAF fighter pilot in World War II, and in command of No. 164 Squadron RAF from May 1944.

References

1917 births
2016 deaths
Recipients of the Distinguished Flying Cross (United Kingdom)
Royal Air Force officers
Royal Air Force pilots of World War II